Alexandros Giotis (Greek: Αλέξανδρος Γιώτης ) (1953–2011) was a Greek journalist and food critic.

References 

1953 births
2011 deaths
Cookbook writers
Greek journalists